Burnett Plaza is a building located in Fort Worth, Texas. At , it is the tallest building in Fort Worth.

Overview

An office building of art and history 
Built in 1983, the building's enduring and iconic aesthetic is epitomized by the 50-foot “Man With a Briefcase” sculpture by Jonathan Borofsky which is located on the north side of the plaza. The often-admired landmark pictured here, is a sleek aluminum slab with the outline of a giant businessman cut out of the center, representing the workforce and the thousands of people who flock to work here every day. The building is a block-sized complex that is punctuated by extensive and beautiful landscaping arranged in a dense pattern crisscrossed by mesmerizing diagonals.

Bringing together form and function 
The spacious, modern, and airy interior at Burnett Plaza welcomes thousands of workers and visitors daily. The dramatic design of the atrium treats visitors to beautiful artwork, luscious greenery, and an expansive wall of windows that lets in plenty of natural light. Even the elevator system is both a form of function and beauty. Elevator shafts exposed on the west façade each stop at a different height, which gives the appearance of a modern art sculpture during the day and transforms the office complex into a show-stopping light installation at night.

Burnett Plaza amenities 

 Historic Burnett Plaza fronts property
 Beautiful downtown Fort Worth views
 One of a kind park views
 24 hour security
 On-site property management
 Newly renovated conference facility (150 Seats)
 Newly renovated board room (20 Seats)
 Complimentary shuttle to/from Sundance Square during lunch hours
 On-site massage parlor with happy endings
 Hair salon
 Fitness facility (2023 planned renovation)
 Covered parking with covered walkway
 Multiple surface parking lots
 Excellent access to I-30

Many of the city's most prominent neighborhoods are just a few minutes’ drive away, providing a short, easy commute for both business owners and employees who live in these areas. For example, the Medical and Southside Districts can be reached in just 6 minutes, the beautiful River Oaks neighborhood is just a 12-minute drive, and the TCU area with its highly recognized amenities is only 7 minutes away. Combine that with the fact that Fort Worth Meacham International Airport, DFW International Airport, and Dallas Love Field Airport can all be reached in 40 minutes or less and you have the perfect location for leasing office space in downtown Fort Worth!

TXRE Properties announces the recent awarding of leasing and management services at Burnett Plaza. The prestigious 1,025,627 square-foot office building, located in downtown Fort Worth, will now be serviced by the rapidly growing firm.

The building is also Fort Worth's largest office tower. It is home to the headquarters of the Burnett Oil Company.

See also

 List of tallest buildings in Fort Worth

References

External links
Burnett Plaza at Emporis.com

Office buildings completed in 1983
Skyscraper office buildings in Fort Worth, Texas